Lounsbury House, formerly known as Grovelawn and as the Ridgefield Veterans Memorial Community Center, is a historic house at 316 Main Street in Ridgefield, Connecticut.  It is a two-story wood frame Classical Revival-style building that was built in 1895.  Its design, by Charles Northrop, was an emulation of the Connecticut State Building exhibited at the 1893 Columbian Exposition, at the request of Governor Phineas C. Lounsbury, who attended the exhibition. It served as his family home. Lounsbury died in 1925, and his heirs gave the house to the town in 1945. The House and classic gardens now serve as a venue for weddings, corporate meetings, art gatherings, festivals and special events.

The building was listed on the National Register of Historic Places in 1975.

See also
National Register of Historic Places listings in Fairfield County, Connecticut

References

External links

Website: LounsburyHouse.org

Houses on the National Register of Historic Places in Connecticut
Houses completed in 1895
Houses in Ridgefield, Connecticut
National Register of Historic Places in Fairfield County, Connecticut
Historic district contributing properties in Connecticut